John of Hoio (Johannes de Hoio; died cca. 1317)  was an abbot of the Cistercian Orval Abbey in present-day Belgium and Triumfontium in Luxembourg who, according to Konrad Eubel, served as the assistant bishop of Trier, simultaneously holding the title of a titular bishop of Duvno in present-day Bosnia and Herzegovina. Dominik Mandić, while researching the history of the Diocese of Duvno, could not find any documents on him, thus being unable to determine whether John of Hoio ever served as a residential bishop in Duvno.

Footnotes

References

Books 

 

1317 deaths
Cistercian abbots
Roman Catholic bishops of Trier
Bishops of Duvno
Cistercian bishops
14th-century Roman Catholic bishops in Croatia
14th-century German Roman Catholic bishops
Bosnia and Herzegovina Roman Catholic bishops